White Clay may refer to:

White clay, another name for the clay mineral kaolin

Places
United States
White Clay, Arizona, an unincorporated community
White Clay Hundred, an unincorporated subdivision of New Castle, Delaware
White Clay Creek, a tributary of the Christina River, in southern Pennsylvania and northern Delaware

See also
Whiteclay (disambiguation)